The 1962 Stanley Cup Finals was the championship series of the National Hockey League's (NHL) 1961–62 season, and the culmination of the 1962 Stanley Cup playoffs. It was contested between the defending champion Chicago Black Hawks and the Toronto Maple Leafs who had last appeared in the Final in 1960. The Maple Leafs won the best-of-seven series, four games to two, to win the Stanley Cup, their first since 1951.

Paths to the Finals
Toronto defeated the New York Rangers to advance to the finals and Chicago defeated the Montreal Canadiens.

Game summaries
Stan Mikita broke Gordie Howe's 1955 playoff record of 20 points, finishing with 21, but it was not enough as the Leafs would defeat the Black Hawks. Dave Keon, making his playoff debut, scored two goals and an assist in the Final.

Stanley Cup engraving
The 1962 Stanley Cup was presented to Maple Leafs captain George Armstrong by NHL President Clarence Campbell following the Maple Leafs 2–1 win over the Black Hawks in game six.

The following Maple Leafs players and staff had their names engraved on the Stanley Cup

1961–62 Toronto Maple Leafs

See also
 1961–62 NHL season

Notes

References

 

Stanley Cup
Stanley Cup Finals
Chicago Blackhawks games
Toronto Maple Leafs games
April 1962 sports events in Canada
1962 in Toronto
Sports competitions in Chicago
1960s in Chicago
1963 in Illinois